The bantamweight competition was the third-lowest weight class featured  at the 2009 World Amateur Boxing Championships, and was held at the Mediolanum Forum. Bantamweights were limited to a maximum of 54 kilograms in body mass.

Medalists

Seeds

  Yankiel León (semifinals)
  Abdelhalim Ouradi (third round)
  Veaceslav Gojan (second round)
  Detelin Dalakliev (champion)
  Tulashboy Doniyorov (quarterfinals)
  Anvar Yunusov (second round)
  John Joe Nevin (semifinals)
  Kanat Abutalipov (quarterfinals)

Draw

Finals

Top Half

Section 1

Section 2

Bottom Half

Section 3

Section 4

See also
Boxing at the 2008 Summer Olympics – Bantamweight

External links
Draw

Bantamweight